Caesar (1898–1914) was a Wire Fox Terrier owned by King Edward VII. He was bred in the kennels of Kathleen, Duchess of Newcastle, and became the constant companion of the King. After the King's death in 1910, the dog attended the funeral and walked in the procession in a prominent position ahead of nine kings and other heads of state. Caesar has been the subject of paintings, and a hand crafted hardstone model created by the House of Fabergé.

Early life
Caesar was born Caesar of Notts in 1898, and was sired by Cackler of Notts. He came from the kennels of Kathleen, Duchess of Newcastle, and was given to King Edward VII by Lord Dudley in 1902 to replace the King's dog Jack who had died after choking on food.

Royal life
During his life with the King, he had a footman assigned to him to clean him and was allowed to sleep on an easy chair next to the King's bed. He wore a collar that read "I am Caesar. I belong to the King".

Caesar would always greet the King excitedly, and the King would often say "Do you like your old master, then?" while the dog was jumping up and down in excitement. Edward would never hit Caesar, but instead tell him off by shaking his walking stick at him while calling him a "naughty dog". Charles Hardinge, 1st Baron Hardinge of Penshurst, reminisced about spending time with the dog whilst on the royal yacht, "Whenever I went into the King's cabin, this dog always went for my trousers and worried them, much to the King's delight. I used not to take the slightest notice and went on talking all the time to the King which I think amused His Majesty still more." Caesar frequently caused problems for the King, escaping in Marienbad whilst chasing white peafowl and on another occasion killing rabbits owned by Lord Redesdale's daughters. The King even considered Caesar to be an obstacle to the Entente Cordiale. He asked his personal attendant, Lawrence Wrightson, to look after Caesar should he die before the dog.

The King ordered hardstone models of his favourite dogs and racehorses from the House of Fabergé. Caesar was at the King's side on the Norfolk estate when the initial wax models were revealed by the company. The model of Caesar was made of chalcedony, rubies, enamel and gold, and included Caesar's collar in the design. The finished model did not arrive until after the King's death, and was purchased by Dame Margaret Greville, who gave the figure to Queen Alexandra. A painting of the dog was also created by Reuben Ward Binks for the King.

After the death of the King on 6 May 1910, Caesar refused to eat, and would spend time whining outside the King's bedroom. At one point, he managed to sneak into the King's bedroom and was found hiding under his bed by Queen Alexandra. The Queen encouraged him to eat once more and restored him to his normal self. Caesar attended the funeral of Edward VII, and led the funeral procession with a highlander walking behind the carriage that carried the King's coffin. He was placed ahead of the heads of state in the procession, including King George V and eight other Kings, an act of which Kaiser Wilhelm II of the German Empire disapproved.

Later life

Within a month of the funeral an unofficial book was published, Where's Master?, giving a first person account of Caesar from the king's death up to the funeral, something which made Queen Mary furious. The book was successful, running to nine reprints in the first year. After the King's death, a portrait of the dog was painted once more, this time by Maud Earl. The painting entitled Silent Sorrow, features Caesar resting his head on the King's favourite chair. The Steiff company produced stuffed toys based on Caesar around 1910.

He remained in the Royal household after the death of the king, although Alice Keppel, long-time mistress to the King, had enquired of Queen Alexandra about what was to happen to Caesar. Despite her previous dislike of the dog, the Queen took interest in the terrier's care and tended to spoil him with treats, confessing to a friend that she was making up for the King being so strict towards him. Caesar died following an operation in April 1914. The Fabergé figurine now forms part of the Royal Collection, while Caesar was included in the sculpture of the King and Queen atop their tomb in St George's Chapel, Windsor Castle. In the sculpture, Caesar lies at the feet of the king.

See also
 Dash (spaniel) – a King Charles Spaniel owned by Queen Victoria
 Susan (dog) – the first Pembroke Corgi owned by Queen Elizabeth II
 List of individual dogs
 Canadian Parliamentary Cats
 Chief Mouser to the Cabinet Office, United Kingdom
 Hermitage cats in Saint Petersburg, Russia
 Pets of Vladimir Putin
 Tibs the Great
 Cats of the President of Taiwan
 United States presidential pets
 Pets in the United Kingdom

References

Pets of the British Royal Family
Individual dogs in politics
1898 animal births
1914 animal deaths
Edward VII
Dogs in the United Kingdom
Individual animals in England